Coop is the surname of:

 Brianna Coop (born 1998), Australian Paralympic sprinter
 Franco Coop (1891–1962), Italian film actor
 Jane Coop (born 1950), Canadian pianist
 Jim Coop (1927–1996), English footballer
 Mick Coop (born 1948), English footballer
 Thomas Coop (1863–1929), English rugby union footballer
 Tony Coop (1934–2021), English golfer

See also
 Dan Coupe (1885–1954), English footballer
 Coopes, surname
 Coops, a surname
 Coope, a surname
 Cooper (surname)
 Koop (disambiguation)
 Coop (disambiguation)